Under Tank Heater (UTH), also called heating mat or heating pad, is a heating device created by the pet industry for husbandry of reptiles and amphibians.  It is a  flat piece of metal and plastic that provides a convenient and easy way to heat your reptiles, amphibian and even aquariums fish tanks. They provide constant heat, allowing you to create the optimal temperature gradient within the nursery

Heaters can be placed under the base of the tank or on the tank wall. This last configuration is usually used in high terrariums, where tropical climbing species are housed.

How to set an Under Tank Heater properly. 
At this point, we will assume that the pad size and type have already been selected. It is common sense to place the heating pad before any other operation when the terrarium is still empty. Trying to orient the pad and ensure good contact is difficult without turning the terrarium.

As a rule, people place the heater at one end of the base, covering 1/3 of the base of the terrarium. Nevertheless, you may also place it on any wall. This area is the hot zone. The temperature emitted will pass through the terrarium walls and substrate, creating a temperature gradient throughout the enclosure. The hot zone is just above the heater. In the opposite zone, the cold zone is where the live food and the water bowl should be placed. To check temperatures are within the recommended range, you can make measurements at different points of the terrain, at different times. For this you can use a simple thermometer o if you want to make things easier, you can purchase a reliable infrared thermometer, so you can take measurements fast and effortless.

The bottom of the terrarium should be clean before installation. A good glass cleaner will be sufficient to remove any dirt or grease that may affect the adhesive of the pad over time.

Determine in advance the final position and orientation of the pad. Once the pad contacts the glass, it is quite difficult to remove.

Installing the under tank heating pad 
You will see the adhesive of the pad after remove the paper cover, leaving the pad as if it were a big sticker. The next step is to rest a short edge of the pad along with the glass. Then, with a swaying motion, gently slide the pad over the glass. Apply gentle pressure, avoiding not to bend the pad too much.

Once in place, press firmly against the glass, paying close attention to the corners and around the power cord. An added benefit of installing in an empty tank is the ability to look through and see where the pad is or is not making good contact.

 Spacers to Avoid Overheating 
The last step is to install the plastic “feet” included in the lower corners of the terrarium. These tiny bumpers adhere permanently to the terrarium molding and effectively elevate it from the surface on which it rests ” or so. This space allows for easy exit of the power cable from the bottom of the terrarium, and also allows excess heat to escape, preventing malfunction or overheating.

Plugged in, under tank heaters provide even warmth under the pad.  A substrate must be used, and the device should always be connected to a thermostat or rheostat to prevent it from overheating and burning the animals.

Aquarium can also be heated by the use of heating mats which are placed beneath the aquarium. Glass is, however, a poor conductor of heat and thus reduces the efficiency of this method of heating.

Under tank heaters should be checked regularly for discoloration or wear, and temperatures should be carefully monitored as well.  Malfunction in an under tank heater could result in higher temperatures which might burn or kill animals, or even start a fire.

References 

Pet equipment